Dyschirius salivagans is a species of ground beetle in the subfamily Scaritinae. It was described by John Lawrence LeConte in 1875.

References

salivagans
Beetles described in 1875